Vao is an islet off the north-eastern coast of Malakula in Vanuatu. The 1999 census showed a population of 667, which increased in 2009 to 898.

The Vao language is spoken on the island.

References

Islands of Vanuatu
Malampa Province